In polymer chemistry photo-oxidation (sometimes: oxidative photodegradation) is the degradation of a polymer surface due to the combined action of light and oxygen. It is the most significant factor in the weathering of plastics. Photo-oxidation causes the polymer chains to break (chain scission), resulting in the material becoming increasingly brittle. This leads to mechanical failure and, at an advanced stage, the formation of microplastics. In textiles the process is called phototendering.

Technologies have been developed to both accelerate and inhibit this process. For example, plastic building components like doors, window frames and gutters are expected to last for decades, requiring the use of advanced UV-polymer stabilizers. Conversely, single-use plastics can be treated with biodegradable additives to accelerate their fragmentation.
Many pigments and dyes can similarly have effects due to their ability to absorb UV-energy.

Susceptible polymers

Susceptibility to photo-oxidation varies depending on the chemical structure of the polymer. Some materials have excellent stability, such as fluoropolymers, polyimides, silicones and certain acrylate polymers. However, global polymer production is dominated by a range of  commodity plastics which account for the majority of plastic waste. Of these polyethylene terephthalate (PET) has only moderate UV resistance and the others, which include polystyrene, polyvinyl chloride (PVC) and polyolefins like polypropylene (PP) and polyethylene (PE) are all highly susceptible. 

Photo-oxidation is a form of photodegradation and begins with formation of free radicals on the polymer chain, which then react with oxygen in chain reactions. For many polymers the general autoxidation mechanism is a reasonable approximation of the underlying chemistry. The process is autocatalytic, generating increasing numbers of radicals and reactive oxygen species. These reactions result in changes to the molecular weight (and molecular weight distribution) of the polymer and as a consequence the material becomes more brittle. The process can be divided into four stages:

Initiation the process of generating the initial free radical. 
Propagation the conversion of one active species to another
Chain branching steps which end with more than one active species being produced. The photolysis of hydroperoxides is the main example.
Termination steps in which active species are removed, for instance by radical disproportionation

Photo-oxidation can occur simultaneously with other processes like thermal degradation, and each of these can accelerate the other.

Polyolefins
Polyolefins such as polyethylene and polypropylene are susceptible to photo-oxidation and around 70% of light stabilizers produced world-wide are used in their protection, despite them representing only around 50% of global plastic production. Aliphatic hydrocarbons can only adsorb high energy UV-rays with a wavelength below ~250nm, however the Earth’s atmosphere and ozone layer screen out such rays, with the normal minimum wavelength being 280-290 nm.
The bulk of the polymer is therefore photo-inert and degradation is instead attributed to the presence of various impurities, which are introduced during the manufacturing or processing stages. These include hydroperoxide and carbonyl groups, as well as metal salts such as catalyst residues. 

All of these species act as photoinitiators.
The organic hydroperoxide and carbonyl groups are able to absorb UV light above 290 nm whereupon they undergo photolysis to generate radicals. Metal impurities act as photocatalysts, although such reactions can be complex. It has also been suggested that polymer-O2 charge-transfer complexes are involved. Initiation generates radical-carbons on the polymer chain, sometimes called macroradicals (P•).

Chain initiation
 Polymer -> P\bullet +\  P\bullet 

Chain propagation
P\bullet +\ O2 -> POO\bullet 
POO\bullet +\ PH -> {POOH} +\ P\bullet 

Chain branching
POOH -> PO\bullet +\  OH\bullet 
{PH} + OH\bullet -> P\bullet +\ H2O
PO\bullet -> Chain\ scission\ reactions

Termination
POO\bullet +\ POO\bullet -> cross\ linking\ reaction\ to\ non-radical\ product
POO\bullet +\ P\bullet -> cross\ linking\ reaction\ to\ non-radical\ product
 P\bullet +\ P\bullet -> cross\ linking\ reaction\ to\ non-radical\ product

Classically the carbon-centred macroradicals (P•) rapidly react with oxygen to form hydroperoxyl radicals (POO•), which in turn abstract an H atom from the polymer chain to give a hydroperoxide (POOH) and a fresh macroradical. Hydroperoxides readily undergo photolysis to give an alkoxyl macroradical radical (PO•) and a hydroxyl radical (HO•), both of which may go on to form new polymer radicals via hydrogen abstraction. Non-classical alternatives to these steps have been proposed. The alkoxyl radical may also undergo beta scission, generating a acyl-ketone and macroradical. This is considered to be the main cause of chain breaking in polypropylene.

Secondary hydroperoxides can also undergo an intramolecular reaction to give a ketone group, although this is limited to polyethylene.

The ketones generated by these processes are themselves photo-active, although much more weakly. At ambient temperatures they undergo Type II Norrish  reactions with chain scission. They may also absorb UV-energy, which they can then transfer to O2, causing it to enter its highly reactive triplet state. Triplet oxygen is a potent oxidising agent can go on to form cause further degradation.

Polystyrene

For polystyrene the complete mechanism of photo-oxidation is still a matter of debate, as different pathways may operate concurrently and vary according to the wavelength of the incident light.
Regardless, there is agreement on the major steps. 

Pure polystyrene should not be able to absorb light with a wavelength below ~280nm and initiation is explained though photo-labile impurities (hydroperoxides) and charge transfer complexes, all of which are able to absorb normal sunlight. Charge-transfer complexes of oxygen and polystyrene phenyl groups absorb light to form singlet oxygen, which acts as a radical initiator.  Carbonyl impurities in the polymer (c.f. acetophenone) also absorb light in the near ultraviolet range (300 to 400nm), forming excited ketones able to abstract hydrogen atoms directly from the polymer. Hyroperoxide undergoes photolysis to form hydroxyl and alkoxyl radicals.

These initiation steps generate macroradicals at tertiary sites, as these are more stabilised. The propagation steps are essentially identical to those seen for polyolefins; with oxidation, hydrogen abstraction and photolysis leading to beta scission reactions and increasing numbers of radicals. 
These steps account for the majority of chain-breaking, however in a minor pathway the hydroperoxide reacts directly with polymer to form a ketone group (acetophenone) and a terminal alkene without the formation of additional radicals.

Polystyrene is observed to yellow during photo-oxidation, which is attributed to the formation of polyenes from these terminal alkenes.

Polyvinyl chloride - (PVC)
Pure organochlorides like polyvinyl chloride (PVC) do not absorb any light above 220 nm. The initiation of photo-oxidation is instead caused by various irregularities in the polymer chain, such as structural defects as well as hydroperoxides, carbonyl groups, and double bonds. 
Hydroperoxides formed during processing are the most important initiator to begin with, however their concentration decreases during photo-oxidation whereas carbonyl concentration increases, as such carbonyls may become the primary initiator over time.

Propagation steps involve the hydroperoxyl radical, which can abstract hydrogen from both hydrocarbon (-CH2-) and organochloride (-CH2Cl-) sites in the polymer at comparable rates. Radicals formed at hydrocarbon sites rapidly convert to alkenes with loss of radical chlorine. This forms allylic hydrogens (shown in red) which are more susceptible to hydrogen abstraction leading to the formation of polyenes in zipper-like reactions.

When the polyenes contain at least eight conjugated double bonds they become coloured, leading to yellowing and eventual browning of the material. This is off-set slightly by longer polyenes being photobleached with atmospheric oxygen, however PVC does eventually discolour unless polymer stabilisers are present. Reactions at organochloride sites proceed via the usual hydroperoxyl and hydroperoxide before photolysis yields the α-chloro-alkoxyl radical. This species can undergo various reactions to give carbonyls, peroxide cross-links  and beta scission products.

Poly(ethylene terephthalate) - (PET)
Unlike most other commodity plastics polyethylene terephthalate (PET) is able to absorb the near ultraviolet rays in sunlight. Absorption begins at 360 nm, becoming stronger below 320 nm and is very significant below 300 nm. Despite this PET has better resistance to photo-oxidation than other commodity plastics, this is due to a poor quantum yield or the absorption. The degradation chemistry is complicated due to simultaneous photodissociation (i.e. not involving oxygen) and photo-oxidation reactions of both the aromatic and aliphatic parts of the molecule. Chain scission is the dominate process, with chain branching and the formation of coloured impurities being less common. Carbon monoxide, carbon dioxide, and carboxylic acids are the main products.
The photo-oxidation of  other linear polyesters such as polybutylene terephthalate and polyethylene naphthalate proceeds similarly. 

Photodissociation involves the formation of an excited terephthalic acid unit which undergoes Norrish reactions. The type I reaction dominates, which cause chain scission at the carbonyl unit to give a range of products.

Type II Norrish reactions are less common but give rise to acetaldehyde by way of vinyl alcohol esters. This has an exceedingly low odour and taste threshold and can cause an off-taste in bottled water.
 

Radicals formed by photolysis may initiate the photo-oxidation in PET. Photo-oxidation of the aromatic terephthalic acid core results in its step-wise oxidation to 2,5-dihydroxyterephthalic acid. The photo-oxidation process at aliphatic sites is similar to that seen for polyolefins, with the formation of hydroperoxide species eventually leading to beta-scission of the polymer chain.

Secondary factors

Environment 
Perhaps surprisingly, the effect of temperature is often greater than the effect of UV exposure. This can be seen in terms of the Arrhenius equation, which shows that reaction rates have an exponential dependence on temperature. By comparison the dependence of degradation rate on UV exposure and the availability of oxygen is broadly linear. As the oceans are cooler than land plastic pollution in the marine environment degrades more slowly. Materials buried in landfill do not degrade by photo-oxidation at all, though they may gradually decay by other processes.

Mechanical stress can effect the rate of photo-oxidation and may also accelerate the physical breakup of plastic objects. Stress can be caused by mechanical load (tensile and shear stresses) or even by temperature cycling, particularly in composite systems consisting of materials with differing temperature coefficients of expansion. Similarly, sudden rainfall can cause thermal stress.

Effects of dyes and other additives
Dyes and pigments are used in polymer materials to provide colour, however they can also effect the rate of photo-oxidation. Many absorb UV rays and in so doing protect the polymer, however absorption can cause the dyes to enter an excited state where they may attack the polymer or transfer energy to O2 to form damaging singlet oxygen. Cu-phthalocyanine is an example, it strongly absorbs UV light however the excited Cu-phthalocyanine may act as a photoinitiator by abstracting hydrogen atoms from the polymer. Its interactions may  become even more complicated when other additives are present.
Fillers such as carbon black can screen out UV light, effectively stabilisers the polymer, whereas flame retardants tend to cause increased levels of photo-oxidation.

Additives to enhance degradation
Biodegradable additives may be added to polymers to accelerate their degradation. In the case of photo-oxidation OXO-biodegradation additives are used. These are transition metal salts such as iron (Fe), manganese (Mn), and cobalt (Co). Fe complexes increase the rate of photooxidation by promoting the homolysis of hydroperoxides via Fenton reactions.

The use of such additives has been controversial due to concerns that treated plastics do not fully biodegrade and instead result in the accelerated formation of microplastics. Oxo-plastics would be difficult to distinguish from untreated plastic but their inclusion during plastic recycling can create a destabilised product with fewer potential uses, potentially jeopardising the business case for recycling any plastic. OXO-biodegradation additives were banned in the EU in 2019

Prevention

UV attack by sunlight can be ameliorated or prevented by adding anti-UV polymer stabilizers, usually prior to shaping the product by injection moulding. UV stabilizers in plastics usually act by absorbing the UV radiation preferentially, and dissipating the energy as low-level heat. The chemicals used are similar to those in sunscreen products, which protect skin from UV attack. They are used frequently in plastics, including cosmetics and films.  Different UV stabilizers are utilized depending upon the substrate, intended functional life, and sensitivity to UV degradation. UV stabilizers, such as benzophenones, work by absorbing the UV radiation and preventing the formation of free radicals.  Depending upon substitution, the UV absorption spectrum is changed to match the application. Concentrations normally range from 0.05% to 2%, with some applications up to 5%.

Frequently, glass can be a better alternative to polymers when it comes to UV degradation. Most of the commonly used glass types are highly resistant to UV radiation. Explosion protection lamps for oil rigs for example can be made either from polymer or glass. Here, the UV radiation and rough weathers belabor the polymer so much, that the material has to be replaced frequently.

Poly(ethylene-naphthalate) (PEN) can be protected by applying a zinc oxide coating, which acts as protective film reducing the diffusion of oxygen. Zinc oxide can also be used on polycarbonate (PC) to decrease the oxidation and photo-yellowing rate caused by solar radiation.

Analysis

Weather testing of polymers

The photo-oxidation of polymers can be investigated by either natural or accelerated weather testing. Such testing is important in determining the expected service-life of plastic items as well as the fate of waste plastic.

Detection

Degradation can be detected before serious cracks are seen in a product by using infrared spectroscopy, which is able to detect chemical species formed by photo-oxidation. In particular, peroxy-species and carbonyl groups have distinct absorption bands.

In the example shown at left, carbonyl groups were easily detected by IR spectroscopy from a cast thin film. The product was a road cone made by rotational moulding in LDPE, which had cracked prematurely in service. Many similar cones also failed because an anti-UV additive had not been used during processing. Other plastic products which failed included polypropylene mancabs used at roadworks which cracked after service of only a few months.

See also
Forensic polymer engineering
Photodegradation
Polymer degradation
Stress corrosion cracking
Thermal degradation of polymers

References

Polymers
Materials degradation
Plastics and the environment
Ultraviolet radiation